Camille Depuiset (born 19 October 1998) is a French handball player for Metz Handball and the French national team.

In September 2018, she was included by EHF in a list of the twenty best young handballers to watch for the future.

References

1998 births
Living people
Sportspeople from Dijon
French female handball players
20th-century French women
21st-century French women